Saiyuki Gaiden, known in Japan as , is an original video animation (OVA) series, based on the same name manga series written and illustrated by Kazuya Minekura, and it is a prequel to the manga series Saiyuki which ended in Ichijinsha's Monthly Comic Zero-Sum magazine in 2009. directed by Naoyuki Kuzuya and written by Hajime Sasaki and released in Japan from March 25, 2011 to April 26, 2013. Saiyuki Gaiden chronicles the story of 500 years before Saiyuki, a heretic child with golden eyes is brought to Heaven and given into the reluctant care of a minor deity, Konzen, nephew of the Merciful Goddess Kanzeon Bosatsu. Konzen eventually names him "Goku". Goku befriends two other minor gods, Marshal Tenpou and General Kenren of the Western Army of Heaven, and a boy who seems to be his age, the War Prince Nataku. Though Goku is happy in his new home, Heaven is not kind to heretics.

In 2011, The OVA series was first licensed by Sentai Filmworks for DVD releases in North America on January 22, 2013.

Also Section23 Films is Home video distributor of Saiyuki Gaiden.

KOKIA performed the opening theme and the ending theme title "Sakura no Kinoshita" and "Hikari no Kata e".

Plot
Heaven, where the gods live. In that world where ‘death’ doesn’t even exist, Konzen Douji spent his days, bored. However, his life begins to change with the introduction of the golden-eyed boy at Kanzeon Bosatsu’s side, said to have been born of a Lower World stone. Charged with looking after the innocent boy, Konzen begins to sense a change in his life, even as he is irritated at being toyed about with. The boy receives the name “Goku” from Konzen Douji, becomes close to Tenpou Gensui and Kenren Taisho of Heaven’s Western Army, and makes his first friend.
Shocked by that friend’s tragic death, Goku unleashes the power of the “Seiten Taisei” bound by his golden diadem, and massacres those in the area with this overwhelming power. Kanzeon Bosatsu knocks out “Seiten Taisei”, but Konzen Douji stops hir from finishing the job. However, for protecting Goku, Konzen Douji, Kenren Taisho, and Tenpou Gensui are made enemies of heaven. They take hostage the Dragon King of the Western Ocean, Gojun, and attempt to flee to the Lower World...

Cast

Release 

The first of three volumes will ship in Japan on March 25, 2011.

The second of the three anime volumes will ship in Japan on June 24, 201 and the third volume releases on September 22, 2011. 

On September 28, 2018 Frontier Works Released All 4 volumes of OVA "Saiyuki Gaiden" Blu-ray BOX by completely new HD digital remastering.

Saiyuki Gaiden: Kouga no Shou 
A special edition (4th episode) under the title , was released in Japan on April 26, 2013, later collected into a two-hour feature-length motion picture with edition Complete Collection was eventually released in North America on DVD in September 13, 2022 by Sentai Filmworks. The OVA is based on chapters 11-13 of the Saiyuki Gaiden with additional content written by the Kazuya Minekura. The story It was after the event of "Saiyuki Gaiden" will be told from Tenpou's point of view.

References

External links 
 OVA "Saiyuki Gaiden" official website 

2011 anime OVAs
2013 anime OVAs
Sentai Filmworks
Saiyuki (manga)